Gustave "Gusty" Kemp (24 February 1917 – 14 April 1948) was a Luxembourger footballer who played as a midfielder for the Luxembourg national football team. He also represented his nation at the 1936 Summer Olympics in Berlin.

Career statistics

Club

Notes

International

International goals
Scores and results list Luxembourg's goal tally first.

References

External links
 

1917 births
1948 deaths
Luxembourgian footballers
Luxembourg international footballers
Association football midfielders
Olympic footballers of Luxembourg
Footballers at the 1936 Summer Olympics
People from Differdange